Tallon Griekspoor was the defending champion and successfully defended his title, defeating Roberto Carballés Baena 6–1, 6–2 in the final.

Seeds

Draw

Finals

Top half

Bottom half

References

External links
Main draw
Qualifying draw

Dutch Open - 1
2022 Singles